Bensonella plicidens is a species of very small air-breathing land snail, a terrestrial pulmonate gastropod mollusk in the family Gastrocoptidae.

Distribution 
This species occurs in Japan.

Description 
The width of the shell is 2 mm. The aperture of the shell is protruded. There are 13-15 denticles within the aperture about 400 μm from the lip.

Views of a shell of Bensonella plicidens:

Ecology 
Potential predators of Bensonella plicidens includes a carnivorous snail Sinoennea iwakawa. Indoennea bicolor is a predator of Bensonella plicidens in laboratory conditions.

References

External links 

Stylommatophora
Taxa named by William Henry Benson